Perkin's Pillar was a vertical pillar of volcanic rock of the Mount Meager massif in southwestern British Columbia, Canada. It existed on the steep north flank of Capricorn Mountain. The upper half of Perkin's Pillar broke sometime in June 2005 and only a jagged sliver remains of the previously mighty summit.

See also
 Cascade Volcanoes
 Garibaldi Volcanic Belt
 Volcanism in Canada
 List of volcanoes in Canada

References
 Perkin's Pillar in the Canadian Mountain Encyclopedia

Mount Meager massif
Volcanic plugs of British Columbia
Two-thousanders of British Columbia
Subduction volcanoes